Louise Allen ( 1870–1909) was an American stage actress and dancer, known for comedic roles. She was the first wife of actor William Collier, with whom she appeared in several productions.

Allen was born around 1870 in San Francisco or New York City to John and Rachel Allen, both of English descent, and educated in San Francisco where her father was a musician. Her siblings included Ricca and Ray Allen, with whom she appeared as the Allen Sisters, a dancing troupe of the 1880s.

Her earliest appearance on the stage was at Niblo's Garden in June 1885, as Bessie in Around the World in Eighty Days. Three years later, she was seen at the Academy of Music in Mazulum, and returning to Niblo's Garden she later played Pepita in Mathias Sandorf. In 1889 she appeared at the Windsor Theatre in The Spider and the Fly. Her first substantial New York success was in 1890, as Ellen in Doctor Bill.

She married William Collier in 1892, and appeared with him in plays over the next several years, their last co-appearance being The Dictator in 1905. She then toured with Lew Fields and went into vaudeville. She died of heart disease at her New York City home on November 8, 1909. Her niece, also named Louise Allen, became a Broadway actress in the 1920s.

Notes

References

External links

 (partial conflation with Allen's niece of the same name)

1870s births
1909 deaths
American stage actresses
Actresses from San Francisco
Vaudeville performers
Actresses from New York City
19th-century American actresses